PT Pertamina Gas Negara Tbk (PGN, trading as Pertamina Gas Negara; formerly known as PT Perusahaan Gas Negara Tbk) is an Indonesian natural gas transportation and distribution company. The total length of distribution pipelines of the company is 3,187 km that serve around 84 million customers.

History
The gas exploitation in Indonesia was managed by a Dutch private gas company named L.J.N Eindhoven & Co., which was established in 1859. The company introduced the use of gas in Indonesia, which was at the time made from coal.

The transfer of power processes occurs at the end of World War II in August 1945, when Japan surrendered to the Allies. This opportunity was used by the youth and electrical workers (through Electricity and Gas Labour/Employee delegation), which together with the chairman of the Central Indonesian National Committee (KNIP) initiated to meet President Sukarno for take over the company to the Government of Indonesia.

On 27 October 1945, President Sukarno formed Jawatan Listrik dan Gas (Bureau of Electricity and Gas) under the Ministry of Public Works and Energy with a power generating capacity of 157.5 MW. In 1958, L.J.N. Eindhoven & Co nationalised and converted into PN Gas.

On 1 January 1961, the Bureau of Electricity and Gas converted into BPU-PLN (Badan Pimpinan Umum Perusahaan Listrik Negara, General Governing Agency of the State Electric Company). The agency, which managed the electricity and gas, then dissolved on 1 January 1965. At the same time, two state-owned companies was initiated: the Perusahaan Listrik Negara (PLN) as the manager of electric power and Perusahaan Gas Negara (PGN) as the manager of gas. PGN was officially established on 13 May 1965.

In 2018, PGN become a subsidiary of Pertamina. PGN has rebranded to become Pertamina Gas Negara on 10 December 2021.

Pipelines
The company owns and operates four transmission pipelines:
Grissik-Duri pipeline - operational since 1998, 536 km length.
Grissik-Singapore pipeline - operational since 2003, 470 km length.
Medan and Jakarta/Bogor pipeline  - operational since 2000, 536 km length.
South Sumatera-West Java pipeline - 1,116 km length.

In 2011 the company distributed  and transmitted  at standard conditions of natural gas

References

External links

 

Pertamina
Natural gas companies
Companies based in Jakarta
Energy companies established in 1965
Non-renewable resource companies established in 1965
Indonesian companies established in 1965
2003 initial public offerings